Guaros de Lara is a Venezuelan professional basketball club, that is based in Barquisimeto, Lara, Venezuela. Guaros de Lara BBC has existed as a club in various different forms since 1983. It has existed in its current form since 2003. 

The club competes in the Venezuelan LPB. The club has won two Venezuelan LPB national domestic titles. On the international stage, the club also has one continental FIBA South American League title, and three intercontinental titles, consisting of two FIBA Americas League titles and one FIBA Intercontinental Cup title.

History
In 1982, Flavio Fridegotto decided to sell his ownership in the Colosos de Carabobo basketball team, which led the club move from Carabobo, to the city of Acarigua. In Acarigua, the club began to compete under the name of Bravos de Portuguesa, in 1983. In 1993, the club moved to Barquisimeto, and changed its name to Malteros de Lara. In 1995, the club changed its name to Bravos de Lara.

The club again relocated, as it moved to the city of Guanare. After moving to Guanare, the club re-named itself to Bravos de Portuguesa once again, in 1998. Former NBA player Carl Herrera played with the team in 1999. In 2003, Carlos García Ibáñez bought the Bravos de Portuguesa club, and he subsequently moved it back to the city of Barquisimeto. After the club returned to Barquisimeto, it was re-named to Guaros de Lara.

In 2016, Guaros de Lara won the 2016 FIBA Americas League championship, and was crowned as the champion of all of Latin America, for the first time. Following their FIBA Americas League championship, Guaros also won the 2016 FIBA Intercontinental Cup, and thus they were crowned world basketball club champions, after beating the Skyliners Frankfurt in the final.

In 2017, Guaros successfully defended their Americas intercontinental title, by defeating Weber Bahía Blanca, by a score of 88–65, in the final of the years' Americas League. Later, they also won their first Venezuelan League national domestic title, by defeating Marinos de Anzoátegui, 4–2, in the Venezuelan League's finals. Afterwards, they won the 2017 FIBA South American League championship, which was the club's first South American continental championship; after defeating Estudiantes Concordia, 3–1, in the league's finals.

Arena
Guaros de Lara plays their home games at the 10,000 seat capacity Domo Bolivariano arena.

Honours

Domestic
Venezuelan League
Champions (2): 2017, 2018
Runners-up (4): 2005, 2006, 2015, 2019

South America
FIBA South American League
Champions (1): 2017

Latin America
FIBA Americas League
Champions (2): 2016, 2017
Runners-up (1): 2019

Worldwide
FIBA Intercontinental Cup
Champions (1): 2016
Runners-up (1): 2017

Current roster

Depth chart

Notable players

 Luis Bethelmy
 Néstor Colmenares
 Gregory Echenique
 Windi Graterol
 Heissler Guillént
 Miguel Marriaga
 José Gregorio Vargas
 Gregory Vargas
 David Cubillán
 David Cooke
 Zach Graham
 Lazar Hayward
 Damion James
 Davon Jefferson
 Mario Little
 Nate Robinson
 Robert Upshaw
 Damien Wilkins
 Branko Cvetković

Head coaches
 Che García
 Iván Déniz
 Fernando Duró

References

External links
Guaros de Lara Official website 
Latin-Basket.com Team Page

Basketball teams in Venezuela